Park Chan-jong (Hangul: 박찬종; born 2 September 1989 in Ulsan) is a South Korean footballer who last played for Hong Kong Premier League club Yuen Long.

He is a versatile midfielder and can play as attacking midfielder or winger.

References

External links

1989 births
Living people
Association football midfielders
South Korean footballers
South Korean expatriate footballers
NK Moslavina players
NK Croatia Sesvete players
NK GOŠK Gabela players
Yuen Long FC players
Hong Kong Premier League players
Expatriate footballers in Hong Kong
South Korean expatriate sportspeople in Hong Kong
People from Ulsan